The 1988 Tour of Britain was the second edition of the Kellogg's Tour of Britain cycle race and was held from 9 August to 14 August 1988. The race started in Newcastle and finished in London. The race was won by Malcolm Elliott of the Fagor team.

Route

General classification

References

1988
Tour of Britain
Tour of Britain
Tour of Britain